Österman is a Swedish-language surname.

Geographical distribution
As of 2014, 56.5% of all known bearers of the surname Österman were residents of Sweden (frequency 1:8,310), 39.9% of Finland (1:6,567) and 2.4% of Estonia (1:26,433).

In Sweden, the frequency of the surname was higher than national average (1:8,310) in the following counties:
 1. Stockholm County (1:3,764)
 2. Södermanland County (1:4,047)
 3. Uppsala County (1:4,602)
 4. Örebro County (1:6,068)
 5. Värmland County (1:7,301)
 6. Gotland County (1:7,310)

In Finland, the frequency of the surname was higher than national average (1:6,567) in the following regions:
 1. Åland (1:1,700)
 2. Satakunta (1:2,113)
 3. Southwest Finland (1:2,251)
 4. Uusimaa (1:3,893)

People
 Bernhard Österman (1870–1938), Swedish painter, illustrator and curator
 Emil Österman (1870–1927), Swedish painter, illustrator and academician
 Hugo Österman (1892–1975), Finnish general
 Hans Österman (born 1978), ITHF table hockey world champion and journalist from Sweden

References

Swedish-language surnames